"Black Man Ray" is a song by China Crisis. Released as the first single from their 1985 album Flaunt the Imperfection, it is one of the band's most successful singles. It spent 13 weeks on the UK Singles Chart and peaked at number 14 in April 1985. It was also the band's biggest hit single in Australia, reaching number 30.

Track listing
UK 7" single
"Black Man Ray" – 3.38
"Animalistic" – 4.32

UK 12" single
"Black Man Ray" – 3.38
"Animalistic" (A Day at the Zoo Mix) – 11.02

UK Limited Edition 12" single
"Black Man Ray" 
"It's Never Too Late"
"Animalistic"

UK CD single (1988)
"Black Man Ray" – 3.38
"Animalistic" (A Day at the Zoo Mix) – 11.02
"Hampton Beach" – 4.47

References

1985 songs
1985 singles
China Crisis songs
Virgin Records singles